Colin Roberts may refer to:
Colin Roberts (footballer) (born 1933), English footballer who played as a wing half
Colin Roberts (diplomat) (born 1959), British diplomat and Governor of the Falkland Islands
Colin Henderson Roberts (1909–1990), classical scholar and publisher

See also
Colin Robertson (disambiguation)